Women's water polo at the 2010 Asian Games was held in Guangzhou, Guangdong, China from November 15 to 17, 2010. In this tournament, 4 teams played.

It also served as the Asian qualification for the 2011 World Aquatics Championships.

Squads

Results 
All times are China Standard Time (UTC+08:00)

Final standing

References

Results

External links
Waterpolo Site of 2010 Asian Games

Women